Christian Workers Union of Sweden may refer to:
Christian Workers Union of Sweden (1898)
Christian Workers Union of Sweden (1899)